The Coincidentalist is the 21st studio album by American singer-songwriter Howe Gelb. It was released on 5 November 2013 worldwide, by American independent label New West Records. Teaming up with M. Ward and Steve Shelley from Sonic Youth, Gelb brings eleven songs inspired by his native Arizona Desert, in which he recorded KT Tunstall's fifth album Invisible Empire // Crescent Moon earlier in 2013.

Recorded at Tucson's Wavelab Studio & Harvey Moltz's studio, The Coincidentalist is an Acoustic rock LP that features guest contributions from Bonnie 'Prince' Billy and KT Tunstall, and received critical acclaim.

During 2014, Howe Gelb embarked a Coincidentalist tour in America and Europe.

Critical reception 

The Coincidentalist received very good ratings. Andy Gill, from The Independent, praised most of the songs, calling the album "a set of relaxed songs", and gave it 3 out of 5 stars. Mojo magazine, with 4 out of 5 stars, wrote that "it's his excellently loose band (featuring M. Ward and Sonic Youth's Steve Shelley), intimate vocals and fondness for chimes that keep the disintegrating threads woven together". NOW magazine, Exclaim!, Blurt Magazine, and Magnet gave the album 4 out of 5 stars.

AllMusic gave the album 4 out of 5 stars, writing: "The Coincidentalist is one of Gelb's most realized efforts; despite its relaxed, airy presentation, it's musically and lyrically provocative, as poetic, strange, and mysterious as the desert itself."

Tucson Weekly, a newspaper from Gelb's hometown, wrote that "it's mixed up close, like an intimate, whispered confidence, as if Gelb were spinning old stories in the privacy of your living room."

Track listing

Personnel
Howe Gelb: vocals, guitar, piano, songwriting, engineering
Thøger Tetens Lund: bass
Steve Shelley: drums
John Paris: mixing
M.Ward: guitar
Thøger Tetens Lund: bass, guitar, cello, bow
Gabrielle Pietrangelo, Laura Kepner-Adney and Caroline Isaacs: Backing Harmonist
Bonnie 'Prince' Billy: vocals track 1
KT Tunstall: vocals track 4
Andrew Bird: violinist
Jon Rauhouse: pedal steel
Luke Bullen: drummer
Chris Shultz, Eric Westfall: engineering
Joe Gastwirt: mastering

Release history

References

Howe Gelb albums
2013 albums